Aphorisms is an EP by post-rock band Red Sparowes, released on Amazon.com as a digital download on July 9, 2008. It was also released a few days later on iTunes. The EP was released on 12" vinyl in November 2009 via Sargent House.

Track listing
 "We Left the Apes to Rot, but Find the Fang Still Grows Within" - 6:37
 "Error Has Turned Animals into Men, and to Each the Fold Repeats" - 5:38
 "The Fear Is Excruciating, but Therein Lies the Answer" - 5:38

Personnel 

 Bryant Clifford Meyer – guitar
 Andy Arahood – guitar, bass
 Greg Burns – bass, pedal steel
 David Clifford – drums
 Brendan Tobin – guitar

References

Post-rock EPs
Red Sparowes albums
2008 EPs
Sargent House albums